Three Days is an American television film directed by Michael Switzer and starring Kristin Davis, Reed Diamond and Tim Meadows. It premiered on ABC Family in 2001 as a part of its 25 Days of Christmas programming block and was filmed in Halifax, Nova Scotia, Canada. It was the last movie produced for Fox Family, as Disney-ABC officially acquired the network in October 2001. The film received a limited Region 2 DVD release, in PAL format. The film had been available on the Disney+ streaming service from launch in 2019 until October 2022.

Summary
Ten years ago, Andrew Farmer (Reed Diamond) married his childhood sweetheart, Beth (Kristin Davis) and the two live in Boston, Massachusetts. Now Andrew is a high-powered literary agent, and his relationship with his wife has not fared as well. After a marital argument about his possible infidelity on Christmas Eve, Beth runs out at midnight and, while trying to retrieve their neighbors' dog in the middle of the street, is killed by a car. An angel, Lionel (Tim Meadows), gives Andrew the chance to relive the last three days as if his wife was alive. However, he cannot change the fate of his wife. There's only one gift he can give to save her life and he only has a very short time to figure out what that gift is. So Andrew spends three days trying to make Beth as happy and figure how to keep her alive, while finding out what he would really be losing.

Cast
 Kristin Davis	...	Beth Farmer
 Reed Diamond	...	Andrew Farmer
 Danielle Brett	...	Kimberly
 Tim Meadows	...	Lionel
 Cedric Smith		
 Alexa Gilmour	...	Megan Harrison Hopkins

Production
The original story and teleplay was conceived and written by Robert Tate Miller while living in the North Hollywood neighborhood of Los Angeles. "I was inspired by Frank Capra's It's a Wonderful Life," Miller said. "I wanted to write a story with heart and, unlike most scripts which take many weeks to hammer out, Three Days came very quickly. It was as if the story wrote itself."

See also
 List of Christmas films
 List of films about angels

External links
 TCM Link
 TV Episode
 

2001 television films
2001 films
American Christmas films
ABC Family original films
2001 fantasy films
Christmas television films
Saban Entertainment films
American fantasy films
Films directed by Michael Switzer
2000s American films